UNTV Ito Ang Balita is a Philippine radio and television late afternoon one-hour and flagship newscast of UNTV. Aired from Monday to Friday at 5:30 PM to 6:30 PM (PST UTC+8). It premiered on July 12, 2004, coinciding with the relaunch of UNTV. The show is also streaming on YouTube and Facebook. The program was temporarily left the air in 2005 and reinstated on September 3, 2007.

Overview 
Ito ang Balita premiered on July 12, 2004, coinciding with the relaunch of UNTV. The newscast is also simulcast on radio thru DWUN Radio La Verdad 1350 kHz AM in Mega Manila.

On July 18, 2016, along with Why News, Hataw Balita and UNTV News (now C-News) officially unveiled its brand new unified graphics and sound.

Anchors
Monica Verallo-Tantoco (2015–present)
Jun Soriao (2022–present)
Bernard Dadis (2020–present)
Victor Cosare (Former Provincial News segment 2017–2018, Weekend Edition 2020–present, and fill-in anchor 2022)
Grace Casin-Cosare (Weekend Edition 2020–present)

Segment Presenters 
Rey Pelayo (The Daily W.I.N.D. segment 2014–present)
Rosalie Coz (World Watch)
Leslie Longboen (Entertainment segment, World Watch 2017–present)
Deb Riveral/Janice Ingente (Provincial News segment 2018–present)
Mon Jocson (H.U.W.A.T segment, fill-in anchor for Casin-Cosare)

Fill-in Anchors 
Bernard Dadis
Rosalie Coz
Victor Cosare

Former anchors
Josel Mallari (2004—2005)
Karen Padilla (2004–2005)
Jay Sonza (2007–2010)
Rolly Lakay Gonzalo (2007–2015; relief anchor for Sonza/Razon)
Candace Giron (2007–2008)
Nina Taduran (2008)
Jun Soriao (2008–2020; relief anchor for Sonza/Razon)
Ley-Ann Lugod (2010–2012)
Daniel Razon (2010–2022)
Nikka Clejofe-Alejar (2012–2013)
Francis Rivera (2010–2011)
Bryan De Paz (2010–2011)
Wylla Soriano (2011–2012)
Louella de Cordova (2012–2014)
Thalia Javier (2015–2017)
Freema Salonga Gloria (Provincial News segment 2016–2017)
Darlene Basingan (2016)
Atty. Regie Tongol (2013–2019)
Angela Lagunzad (2014–2022)

Ito Ang Balita Weekend Edition 

On June 6, 2020, UNTV expanded to six days a week, branding the weekend edition albeit in a capacity as a 1-hour newscast, unlike the 90 minute weekday edition.

Program Segments 
Tulong Muna Bago Balita – Emergency Response Reports
Police Report (formerly Police Blotter) - Police Reports
Traffic Report (formerly Traffic Update and Gabay Kalsada) – Traffic Updates across the Philippines
World Watch – Stories from Around the Globe
Balitang Promdi – Provincial News
Sports News (formerly Sports Balita and Sports 37)
Entertainment and Feature News (formerly E News and Aliwan atbp.)
Serbisyong Bayanihan/MCGI Cares: Update
The Daily W.I.N.D.: Weather Insights Night and Day (formerly Weather Update) – Weather News and Forecast
Poll Watch – Election News
HUWAT: Health Update, Weather and Traffic — The latest updates about traffic conditions, COVID-19 daily case updates, weather updates from PAGASA, and relevant trivia.
• Usiserong Pinoy (Usapang Sinsero ng Pinoy) - features live chat comments of avid viewers from their YouTube livestream.

• Ibang Balita Ito - features trending topic videos on the social media platforms.

• UNTV Cup: Update - latest update for scorings and game schedules.

Accolades

See also
Progressive Broadcasting Corporation 
UNTV News and Rescue 
Daniel Razon

References

Members Church of God International
2004 Philippine television series debuts
2005 Philippine television series endings
2007 Philippine television series debuts
Filipino-language television shows
Flagship evening news shows
Philippine television news shows
UNTV (Philippines) original programming